Alexandria is an unincorporated community in Scioto County, in the U.S. state of Ohio.

History
Alexandria was platted in 1799 and was either named after Alexandria, Virginia, or after Alexander Parker, the brother of a first settler. A post office was established at Alexandria in 1805, and later was discontinued at an unknown date (1808, according to one source).

References

Unincorporated communities in Scioto County, Ohio
Unincorporated communities in Ohio